Pavao Posilovich, O.F.M. or Pavao Posilović (1597–1657) was a Roman Catholic prelate who was Bishop of Duvno (1655–1657) and Bishop of Skradin (1642–1655).

Life
Paul Posilovich was born in Glamoč in 1597 and ordained a priest in the Order of Friars Minor.
On 16 June 1642, he was appointed during the papacy of Pope Urban VIII as Bishop of Scardona.
On 7 September 1642, he was consecrated bishop by Giovanni Battista Maria Pallotta, Cardinal-Priest of San Silvestro in Capite, with Alfonso Gonzaga, Titular Archbishop of Rhodus, and Patrizio Donati, Bishop of Minori, as co-consecrators. 
On 25 October 1655, he was appointed during the papacy of Pope Alexander VII as Bishop of Duvno.
He was Bishop of Duvno until his death in 1657.

Works
Pavao wrote two didactic works in Croatian Cyrillic:
Cviet od koristih duhovnih i tilesnie, izvaden iz jezika latinskoga u jezili ilirisčki aliti slovinski (Venice, 1647)
Naslagjenje duhovno (Venice, 1639; 1682).

References

1597 births
1657 deaths
People from Glamoč
Croats of Bosnia and Herzegovina
Franciscans of the Franciscan Province of Bosnia
Bishops of Duvno
Bishops appointed by Pope Urban VIII
Bishops appointed by Pope Alexander VII
Bosnia and Herzegovina Roman Catholic bishops
17th-century Roman Catholic bishops in Croatia
Bosnia and Herzegovina writers